A. Howard Matz (born 1943) is a former United States district judge of the United States District Court for the Central District of California.

Education and career

Matz was born in Brooklyn, New York. He received an Artium Baccalaureus degree from Columbia University in 1965 and a Juris Doctor from Harvard Law School in 1968. Matz clerked for Judge Morris E. Lasker of the United States District Court for the Southern District of New York, and was in private practice in New York from 1970 to 1972. Matz moved to Los Angeles with the law firm of Hughes Hubbard & Reed, where he worked from 1972 to 1974. He served as an Assistant U.S. Attorney for the Central District of California from 1974 to 1978, and was Chief of the Special Prosecutions unit from 1977 to 1978, when he left to return to Hughes Hubbard as a partner.

Federal judicial service

On October 27, 1997, President Bill Clinton nominated Matz to a seat on the Central District of California vacated by Harry Lindley Hupp. Matz was unanimously confirmed by the Senate on June 26, 1998, and received his commission on June 29, 1998. He assumed senior status on July 11, 2011, and retired on April 1, 2013.

Notable rulings

 Matz presided over the first legal challenge to the U.S. government's treatment of Guantanamo Bay detainees in a habeas corpus petition brought by a civil rights group seeking relief for the detainees.
 Matz was the judge in Perfect 10 v. Google, Inc., a copyright case in which Perfect 10 sued Google for displaying thumbnail-sized reproductions of its images. Matz rejected Google's fair use defense, distinguishing Kelly v. Arriba Soft Corporation. The Ninth Circuit reversed in Perfect 10, Inc. v. Amazon.com, Inc..

See also
List of Jewish American jurists

References

External links

Judge's Procedures and Schedules
 

1943 births
Living people
Assistant United States Attorneys
Columbia College (New York) alumni
Harvard Law School alumni
Judges of the United States District Court for the Central District of California
People from Brooklyn
United States district court judges appointed by Bill Clinton
20th-century American judges
21st-century American judges